Marvin Thiele (born 1 September 1998) is a German footballer who plays as a forward for VfB Empor Glauchau.

References

External links
 Profile at FuPa.net

1998 births
Living people
People from Glauchau
Footballers from Saxony
German footballers
Association football forwards
Chemnitzer FC players
3. Liga players